Two Rivers High School (formerly known as Henry Sibley High School), located in Mendota Heights, Minnesota, United States, was founded in 1954. The current school was built in 1971 to serve students in grades 9–12. Today, it serves students in grades 9–12 and houses the district’s administrative offices. It underwent extensive remodeling of several areas in the school thanks to passage of a facilities and technology referendum in 2004. It serves as the public high school for the communities of Mendota Heights, Mendota, Sunfish Lake, Lilydale, West St. Paul and parts of Inver Grove Heights and Eagan. It is a member of the Metro East Conference.

It was formerly named for Henry Hastings Sibley and in 2021, the District 197 School Board voted to change the name to Two Rivers High School. The change was prompted by the reexamination of Sibley's role in the Dakota War of 1862 and the country's largest mass execution.

Demographics

For the 2014-2015 school year, Two Rivers High School had 1,387 students.  The ethnicity breakdown is as follows:

 American Indian/Alaskan Native - 1%
 Asian - 5%
 Black - 8%
 Hawaiian Native/Pacific Islander - 0.2%
 Hispanic - 27%
 White - 56%
 Other - 3%

Notable alumni
Ann Bancroft, Polar explorer
Greg Norton, bassist for Hüsker Dü
Steve Sack, longtime editorial cartoonist for the Minneapolis Star Tribune

References

External links

Public high schools in Minnesota
Educational institutions established in 1954
Schools in Dakota County, Minnesota
1954 establishments in Minnesota